Andriy Sorokin (born 1 January 1991) is a Ukrainian professional footballer who plays with FC Continentals in the Canadian Soccer League.

Club career

Early career 
Sorokin played with the reserve teams of FC Inhulets Petrove originally in the Ukrainian Amateur Football Championship and ultimately joined the professional ranks in the Ukrainian Second League in 2017. For the 2017-18 season, he continued playing in the country's third tier with Myr Hornostayivka. Following his stint in the professional realm, he returned to the amateur level to play with VPK-Ahro Shevchenkivka where he won the Dnipropetrovsk regional title. After a year's absence, he returned to Myr Hornostayivka in 2019.

Belarus 
In the summer of 2019, he played abroad in the Belarusian Premier League with Slavia Mozyr. In his debut season in Belarus, he made two appearances. His stint with Slavia was brief and was released after his two appearances.

Ukraine  
He returned to Ukraine to play in the Ukrainian First League with Hirnyk-Sport Horishni Plavni. In total, he played in 5 matches and recorded one goal. He left Hirnyk after a single season. The following season he resumed playing in the second tier with Avanhard Kramatorsk. Sorokin left Kramatorsk midway through the 2020-21 season in order to complete the season with Krystal Kherson.

Canada 
In 2022, he signed a two-year contract with FC Continentals in the Canadian Soccer League. Throughout the season he helped the club secure a postseason berth by finishing fourth in the standings. He featured in the CSL Championship final where Continentals defeated Scarborough SC for the title.

References

External links 
 
 
 

1991 births
Living people
Ukrainian footballers
Association football midfielders
Ukrainian expatriate footballers
Expatriate footballers in Belarus
Ukrainian expatriate sportspeople in Belarus
FC Inhulets-2 Petrove players
FC VPK-Ahro Shevchenkivka players
FC Myr Hornostayivka players
FC Slavia Mozyr players
FC Hirnyk-Sport Horishni Plavni players
FC Kramatorsk players
FC Krystal Kherson players
FC Continentals players
Belarusian Premier League players 
Ukrainian First League players 
Ukrainian Second League players
Canadian Soccer League (1998–present) players
Expatriate soccer players in Canada